Nils Aall Barricelli (24 January 1912 – 27 January 1993) was a Norwegian-Italian mathematician.

Barricelli's early computer-assisted experiments in symbiogenesis and evolution are considered pioneering in artificial life research. Barricelli, who was independently wealthy, held an unpaid residency at the Institute for Advanced Study in Princeton, New Jersey in 1953, 1954, and 1956. He later worked at the University of California, Los Angeles, at Vanderbilt University (until 1964), in the Department of Genetics of the University of Washington, Seattle (until 1968) and then at the Mathematics Institute of the University of Oslo. Barricelli published in a variety of fields including virus genetics, DNA, theoretical biology, space flight, theoretical physics and mathematical language.

References

External links
 George Dyson TED talk discusses Barricelli
 Barricelli : Built with Processing and Processing.js, by Alexander R. Gallow.

1912 births
1993 deaths
20th-century Norwegian mathematicians
Institute for Advanced Study visiting scholars
Researchers of artificial life
Symbiogenesis researchers
Italian expatriates in the United States
Italian emigrants to Norway